Joe Glow, the Firefly is a 1941 Warner Bros. Looney Tunes cartoon directed by Chuck Jones. The short was released on March 8, 1941.

Plot
A firefly enters a tent where a man is sleeping.  The firefly slips and slides all over the man's face and then investigates the food in the tent.  Having looked everything over, the firefly shouts a single word into the man's ear.

See also
 List of American films of 1941

References

External links

 

1941 animated films
1941 films
Looney Tunes shorts
Warner Bros. Cartoons animated short films
Short films directed by Chuck Jones
Animated films about insects
Films scored by Carl Stalling
American black-and-white films
1940s Warner Bros. animated short films
1940s English-language films